Sigma  is a letter of the Greek alphabet.

Sigma may also refer to:

Aviation
Advance Sigma, a Swiss paraglider design

Companies and organizations 
 Sigma AB, a Swedish IT consultancy company
 Sigma Alimentos, Multinational food processing and distribution company
 Sigma Corporation, a Japanese camera and lens manufacturer
 Sigma Designs, Inc., a US semiconductor manufacturer
 Sigma Motor Corporation, a defunct  South African motor vehicle assembler and manufacturer
 Sigma Motors, a Pakistani assembler of Land Rovers
 Sigma Healthcare, an Australian pharmaceutical company
 Sigma Sigma Sigma (Tri-Sigma), an American women sorority centered on education & scholarship
 Sigma Sport, a German manufacturer of electronic sports equipment
 Sigma TV, a television channel in Cyprus
 Sigma (operations research), a company founded in the UK in 1961
 SIGMA (verification service), Nielsen Media Research's tracking system for videos
 Sigma-Aldrich, an American chemical company
 Telkomsigma or Sigma Cipta Caraka, an Indonesian IT company

Films and television
 Ood Sigma, a fictional character from the Doctor Who series
 Space City Sigma, a 1980s Indian science fiction TV series
 Sigma, a fictional character from the anime Tweeny Witches
 Sigma Society, a fictional Mensa-type club, appearing in the third episode of Columbo sixth season

Mathematics 
 Summation operator forming a series in mathematics Σ
 Standard deviation in statistics σ
 Divisor function in number theory σ
 Sigma-algebra (σ-algebra, σ-field) in set theory
 A busy beaver function in computability theory Σ
 , a set in the polynomial hierarchy
 Harish-Chandra's σ function
 Weierstrass sigma function
 Sigma additivity

Music
 Sigma (album)
 Sigma (DJs), a British drum and bass duo
 Sigma AZ (band), punk rock band from Phoenix, Arizona

Places
 Sigma, Capiz, a municipality in the Philippines
 Sigma, Lee County, Virginia, United States
 Sığma, Sarayköy
 The Sigma Plan, to raise the dikes of the Scheldt River in Belgium

Products 
 GM Sigma platform, an automobile platform
 Mitsubishi Sigma
 SDS Sigma series of computers from Scientific Data Systems
 Sigma (sailplane)
 Sigma Guitars
 Six Sigma quality management program
 Smith & Wesson Sigma, a firearm

Science 
 σ, sigma bond in chemistry 
 σ, sigma factor of RNA polymerase in biology 
 σ, Stefan–Boltzmann constant of radiation in physics
 σ, stress (mechanics), the force per unit area applied by internal forces of a material 
 σ, the electronic substituent constant for activation of substituted arenes in the Hammett equation
 σ, a measure of a material's electrical conductivity ability 
 Cross section σ in physics
 Pauli matrices in quantum physics
 Sigma baryon in particle physics
 Sigma receptor, a neural receptor
 Surface charge density in classical electromagnetism

Sport
 Sigma FC, a Canadian soccer team
 SK Sigma Olomouc, a Czech association football team
 Histor–Sigma, a Belgian professional cycling team known as Sigma in 1986

Video games 
 Sigma (Mega Man X), the villain of the Mega Man X series
 Sigma (Overwatch), a hero from Overwatch
 Ninja Gaiden Sigma, a video game
 Sigma, a character in the BioShock 2 video game universe
 Sigma Harmonics, a video game
 Sigma Klim, a major character and protagonist in the Zero Escape video game series
 Sigma, a team on the Dota 2 online video game

Other 
 Sigma (couch), used in ancient Roman banquets
 Sigma class corvette, a naval ship
 Sigma male, in the dominance hierarchy

See also
 Sygma (disambiguation)

Disambiguation pages for Greek letter names